Chondrula is a genus of air-breathing land snails, terrestrial pulmonate gastropod mollusks in the family Enidae. 

Chondrula is the type genus of the tribe Chondrulini.

Distribution 
Distribution of the genus Chondrula ranges from Europe and northern Africa and to Iran.

Species
Species within the genus Chondrula include:

 Chondrula albolimbata (Pfeiffer, 1859)
 Chondrula beieri Klemm, 1962 - from Greece
 Chondrula bergeri (Roth, 1839) 
 Chondrula bicallosa (Pfeiffer, 1847)
 Chondrula consentanea (Westerlund, 1887) - from the Balkans
 Chondrula diodon (Retowski, 1883)
 Chondrula jaczewskii (Wagner, 1928)
 Chondrula lugorensis Wagner, 1914 - from the Balkans
 Chondrula lycaonica (Sturany, 1904) - from Turkey
 Chondrula macedonica Wagner, 1914 
 Chondrula microtragus (Rossmässler, 1839)
 Chondrula mletaki Lajtner, 1993
 Chondrula munita (Westerlund, 1894) - synonym: Chondrula minuta, from Greece
 Chondrula orientalis (Pfeiffer, 1848) - from Turkey
 Chondrula pindica (Westerlund, 1894) - from Greece
 Chondrula pupa (Linnaeus, 1758)
 Chondrula quinquedentata (Rossmässler, 1837)
 Chondrula sturmii (Küster, 1852) - from Turkey
 Chondrula tricuspidata (Küster, 1843)
 Chondrula tridens (O. F. Müller, 1774) - type species
 Chondrula vaderi Gittenberger, 1967
 Chondrula werneri (Sturany, 1902) - from Turkey
synonyms
 Chondrula nachicevanjensis Hudec, 1972: synonym of Multidentula nachicevanjensis (Hudec, 1972) 
 Chondrula peloponnesica Gittenberger, 1984 is a synonym of Mastus peloponnesicus (Gittenberger, 1984)
 Chondrula pupa (Linnaeus, 1758) is a synonym of Mastus pupa (Linnaeus, 1758)

References

Enidae